Euphaedra mariaechristinae, or Marie-Christine's striped forester, is a butterfly in the family Nymphalidae. It is found in eastern Ivory Coast and Ghana. The habitat consists of dense tropical rain forests.

Similar species
Other members of the Euphaedra zaddachii species group q.v.

References

Butterflies described in 2003
mariaechristinae